Russian organized crime or Russian mafia, otherwise known as Bratva, is a collective of various organized crime elements originating in the former Soviet Union. The initialism OPG is Organized Criminal (prestupnaya in Russian) Group, used to refer to any of the Russian mafia groups, sometimes modified with a specific name, e.g. Orekhovskaya OPG. Sometimes the initialism is translated and OCG is used.

Organized crime in Russia began in the Russian Empire, but it was not until the Soviet era that vory v zakone ("thieves-in-law") emerged as leaders of prison groups in forced labor camps, and their honor code became more defined. With the end of World War II, the death of Joseph Stalin, and the fall of the Soviet Union, more gangs emerged in a flourishing black market, exploiting the unstable governments of the former republics. Louis Freeh, former director of the FBI, said that the Russian mafia posed the greatest threat to US national security in the mid-1990s.

In 2012, there were as many as 6,000 groups, with more than 200 of them having a global reach. Criminals of these various groups are either former prison members, corrupt officials and business leaders, people with ethnic ties, or people from the same region with shared criminal experiences and leaders. In December 2009, Timur Lakhonin, the head of the Russian National Central Bureau of Interpol, stated "Certainly, there is crime involving our former compatriots abroad, but there is no data suggesting that an organized structure of criminal groups comprising former Russians exists abroad", while in August 2010, Alain Bauer, a French criminologist, said that it "is one of the best structured criminal organizations in Europe, with a quasi-military operation." Since the 1980s, the Russian mafia has been among the most powerful, dangerous and feared criminal organizations in the world, and as of 2022, the organization remains to be among the world's largest, deadliest and most powerful crime syndicates. The FBI has called them a "criminal superpower".

The Russian mafia is similar to the Italian Mafia in many ways, the groups organization and structure follow a similar model. The two groups also share a similar portfolio of criminal activity. The highly publicized Italian Mafia is believed to have inspired early criminal groups in Russia to form Mafia-like organizations, eventually spawning their own version. The Russian mafia, however, differed from the Italians due to their environment. The level of political corruption and arms sales in a post-Soviet Russia allowed for massive expansion and incorporation of many government officials into the crime syndicates. The Russians also dabbled in uranium trading, stolen from the Soviet nuclear program, and human trafficking.

History

Origins
The Russian criminality can be traced back to Russia's imperial period, which began in the 1720s, in the form of banditry and thievery. Most of the population were peasants, in poverty at the time, and criminals who stole from government entities and divided profits among the people earned Robin Hood-like status, being viewed as protectors of the poor and becoming folk heroes. In time, the Vorovskoy Mir (Thieves' World) emerged as these criminals grouped and started their own code of conduct that was based on strict loyalty with one another and opposition against the government. 

Joseph Stalin was a crime boss and gangster during the early 1900s. Amid growing violence, Stalin formed his own armed Red Battle Squads. They raised funds through a protection racket on large local businesses and mines. Stalin also established a small group which he called the Bolshevik Expropriators Club, although it would more widely be known as the Group or Outfit. Containing about ten members, three of whom were women, the group procured arms, facilitated prison escapes, raided banks, and executed traitors.

When the Bolshevik Revolution came around in 1917, the Thieves' World was alive and active. Vladimir Lenin attempted to wipe them out, but it failed, and the criminals survived into Joseph Stalin's reign.

1917–1991: Soviet era
During Stalin's reign as ruler, millions of people were sent to gulags (Soviet labor camps), where powerful criminals worked their way up to become vorami v zakone ("thieves-in-law"). These criminal elites often conveyed their status through complicated tattoos, symbols still used by Russian mobsters.

After Hitler's invasion of the Soviet Union during World War II, Stalin was recruiting more men to fight for the nation, offering prisoners freedom if they joined the army. Many flocked to help out in the war, but this act betrayed the codes of the Thieves' World that one must not ally with the government. Those who chose not to fight in the war referred to the traitors as suka ("bitch"), and the traitors landed at the bottom of the "hierarchy". Outcast, the suki separated from the others and formed their own groups and power bases by collaborating with prison officials, eventually gaining the luxury of comfortable positions. Bitterness between the groups erupted into a series of Bitch Wars from 1945 to 1953 with many killed every day. The prison officials encouraged the violence, seeing it as a way to rid the prisons of criminals.

While Hitler’s invasion of Russia during WWII caused countless casualties on the battlefield, it also led to one of the more violent periods in the history of Russian organized crime. In 1941, as the German army approached, Stalin desperately looked for ways to bolster the Russian army’s numbers. Turning to the seemingly endless supply of able-bodied men overflowing the gulags and prison system, Stalin promised the vor a chance to win back their freedom by defending Russia against the imminent attack. Joining the army to fight for Stalin (cooperating with the government) was a flagrant violation of the criminal code of honor, yet for many, this offer was too tempting to refuse. Thousands of prisoners signed up to defend against the Nazi threat and regain their freedom; that freedom, however, proved to be only momentary. Following the conclusion of the war in 1945, Stalin reneged on his initial promise, throwing the vor soldiers right back into the gulags that they had so desperately tried to escape. This marked the beginning of what would be known as the “Suki Wars.” Though the prison system had never been a particularly safe haven to begin with, the return to the gulags was a death sentence for the vor who had fought in the Red Army. To the vory v zakone, cooperating with the government was tantamount to treason; therefore, the thieves who had remained in prison saw the actions of the thieves-turned-soldiers as the ultimate betrayal. These “traitors,” called suki, were systematically slaughtered in the gulags as a punishment for their treachery and cowardice. The prison guards did nothing to stop the massacre, and in fact often encouraged the violence, as they viewed it was a quick and cost-effective method for thinning the criminal ranks within the prison system. It is unknown just how many suki were killed during this extermination process, but in 1953, eight million prisoners were finally released. By then, the culture of the Russian criminal underworld had been irreparably altered—no longer did a criminal need to abide by the antiquated rules of the old “Thieves’ World.”

Then, in the 1980s, Mikhail Gorbachev loosened restrictions on private businesses, allowing them to grow legally, but by then, the Soviet Union was already beginning to collapse.

Also during the 1970s and 1980s, the United States expanded its immigration policies, allowing Soviet Jews, with most settling in a southern Brooklyn area known as Brighton Beach (sometimes nicknamed "Little Odessa"). Here is where Russian organized crime began in the US. The earliest known case of Russian crime in the area was in the mid-1970s by the "Potato Bag Gang," a group of con artists disguised as merchants that told customers that they were selling antique gold rubles for cheap, but in fact, gave them bags of potatoes when bought in thousands. By 1983, the head of Russian organized crime in Brighton Beach was Evsei Agron.

Pauol Mirzoyan was a prime target among other mobsters including rival Boris Goldberg and his organization, and in May 1985 Agron was assassinated. Boris "Biba" Nayfeld, his bodyguard, moved on to employ under Marat Balagula, who was believed to have succeeded Agron's authority. In the following year, Balagula fled the country after he was convicted in a fraud scheme of Merrill Lynch customers, and was found in Frankfurt, West Germany in 1989, where he was extradited back to the US and sentenced to eight years in prison.

Balagula would later be convicted on a separate $360,000 credit card fraud in 1992. Nayfield took Balagula's place, partnering with the "Polish Al Capone", Ricardo Fanchiniin, in an import-export business and setting up a heroin business. In 1990, his former friend, Monya Elson, back from a six-year prison sentence in Israel, returned to America and set up a rival heroin business, culminating in a mafia turf war.

1992–2000: Growth and internationalization
When the USSR collapsed and a free market economy emerged, organized criminal groups began to take over Russia's economy, with many ex-KGB agents and veterans of the Afghan war offering their skills to the crime bosses. Gangster summit meetings had taken place in hotels and restaurants shortly before the Soviet's dissolution, so that top vory v zakone could agree on who would rule what, and set plans on how to take over the post-communist states. 

In the 1990s in Russia, as well as in other post-Soviet countries, vast deposits of natural resources and businesses that the state had owned for decades were privatised. Former Soviet bureaucrats, factory directors, aggressive businessmen and criminal organizations used insider deals, bribery and simple brute force in order to grab lucrative assets. Businesses began building their own private armies of security agents, bodyguards and commercial spies. They often simply bought the people and weapons of the former Soviet state, or even those of the current Russian police. Russia's new capitalists spent millions of dollars for protection, buying armor-plated cars, bomb sensors, hidden cameras, bulletproof vests, anti-wiretapping gear, weapons, recruiting veterans of the Afghan and Chechen wars as their bodyguards. However, almost every business in Russia, from curbside vendors to huge oil and gas companies, made payments to the organized crime for protection ("krysha"). Businessmen said that they needed the "krysha" because the laws and the court system were not functioning properly in Russia. The only way for them to enforce a contract was to turn to a criminal "krysha". They also used it to intimidate competitors, enforce contracts, collect debts or take over new markets. It was also becoming increasingly common for Russian businesses to turn to the "red krysha" (the corrupt police who doubled as a paid protection racket). Contract killings were common.

The discussion notes that Russian mobsters now operate in more than 50 countries around the world. Their background in a totalitarian country with widespread corruption has resulted in their development of a unique business acumen. Thirty Russian crime syndicates operate in at least 17 cities in the United States. In addition, both the Bush and the Clinton Administrations have unwittingly facilitated the Russian mob and the untrammeled corruption of Russia since the fall of the Soviet Union.

In early 1993, the Russian Ministry of Internal Affairs reported there were over 5,000 organized crime groups operating in Russia. These groups had an estimated 100,000 members with a leadership of 18,000. Although Russian authorities have currently identified over 5,000 criminal groups in that country, Russian officials believe that only approximately 300 of those have some identifiable structure. 11 organized crime groups in Russia are not nearly as structured as those in the US, such as the LCN.

It was the period of internationalization of Russian organized crime. It was agreed that Vyacheslav "Yaponchik" Ivankov would be sent to Brighton Beach in 1992, allegedly because he was killing too many people in Russia and also to take control of Russian organized crime in North America. Within a year, he built an international operation that included, but was not limited to, narcotics, money laundering, and prostitution and made ties with the American Mafia and Colombian drug cartels, eventually extending to Miami, Los Angeles, and Boston. Those who went against him were usually killed.

Prior to Ivankov's arrival, Balagula's downfall left a void for America's next vory v zakone. Monya Elson, leader of Monya's Brigada (a gang that similarly operated from Russia to Los Angeles to New York), was in a feud with Boris Nayfeld, with bodies dropping on both sides. Ivankov's arrival virtually ended the feud, although Elson would later challenge his power as well, and a number of attempts were made to end the former's life. Nayfield and Elson would eventually be arrested in January 1994 (released in 1998) and in Italy in 1995, respectively.

According to FBI reports, the crime boss Semion Mogilevich had alliances with the Camorra, in particular with Salvatore DeFalco, a lower-echelon member of the Giuliano clan. Mogilevich and DeFalco would have held meetings in Prague in 1993.Semion Mogilevich's net worth is estimated to be 10 billion dollar.

Ivankov's reign also ended in June 1995 when a $3.5 million extortion attempt on two Russian businessmen, Alexander Volkov and Vladimir Voloshin, ended in an FBI arrest that resulted in a ten-year maximum security prison sentence. Before his arrest and besides his operations in America, Ivankov regularly flew around Europe and Asia to maintain ties with his fellow mobsters (like members of the Solntsevskaya Bratva), as well as reinforce ties with others. This did not stop other people from denying his growing power. In one instance, Ivankov attempted to buy out Georgian boss Valeri "Globus" Glugech's drug importation business. When the latter refused the offer, he and his top associates were shot dead. A summit held in May 1994 in Vienna rewarded him with what was left of Glugech's business. Two months later, Ivankov got into another altercation with drug kingpin and head of the Orekhovskaya gang, Segei "Sylvester" Timofeyev, ending with the latter murdered a month later.

In 1995, the Camorra cooperated with the Russian mafia in a scheme in which the Camorra would bleach out US$1 bills and reprint them as $100s. These bills would then be transported to the Russian mafia for distribution in 29 post-Eastern Bloc countries and former Soviet republics. In return, the Russian mafia paid the Camorra with property (including a Russian bank) and firearms, smuggled into Eastern Europe and Italy.

A report by the United Nations in 1995 placed the number of individuals involved in organized crime in Russia at 3 million, employed in about 5,700 gangs.

Back in Eastern Europe in May 1995, Semion Mogilevich held a summit meeting of Russian mafia bosses in his U Holubu restaurant in Anděl, a neighborhood of Prague. The excuse to bring them together was that it was a birthday party for Victor Averin, the second-in-command of the Solntsevskaya Bratva. However, Major Tomas Machacek of the Czech police got wind of an anonymous tip-off that claimed that the Solntsevskaya were planning to assassinate Mogilevich at the location (it was rumored that Mogilevich and Solntsevskaya leader Sergei Mikhailov had a dispute over $5 million), and the police successfully raided the meeting. 200 guests were arrested, but no charges were put against them; only key Russian mafia members were banned from the country, most of whom moved to Hungary.

One person who was not there was Mogilevich himself. He claimed that "[b]y the time I arrived at U Holubu, everything was already in full swing, so I went into a neighboring hotel and sat in the bar there until about five or six in the morning." Mikhailov would later be arrested in Switzerland in October 1996 on numerous charges, including that he was the head of a powerful Russian mafia group, but was exonerated and released two years later after evidence was not enough to prove much.

The global extent of Russian organized crime was not realized until Ludwig "Tarzan" Fainberg was arrested in January 1997, primarily because of arms dealing. In 1990, Fainberg moved from Brighton Beach to Miami and opened up a strip club called Porky's, which soon became a popular hangout for underworld criminals. Fainberg himself gained a reputation as an ambassador among international crime groups, becoming especially close to Juan Almeida, a Colombian cocaine dealer. Planning to expand his cocaine business, Fainberg acted as an intermediary between Almeida and the corrupt Russian military. He helped him get six Russian military helicopters in 1993, and in the following year, helped arrange to buy a submarine for cocaine smuggling. Unfortunately for the two of them, federal agents had been keeping a close eye on Fainberg for months. Alexander Yasevich, an associate of the Russian military contact and an undercover DEA agent, was sent to verify the illegal dealing, and in 1997, Fainberg was finally arrested in Miami. Facing the possibility of life imprisonment, the latter agreed to testify against Almeida in exchange for a shorter sentence, which ended up being 33 months.

The  published a website in 2000 containing Philipp Bobkov's MOST Group Security Database along with files from RUOP and other departments and special services.

Vanuatu was a preferred location for Russian mafia laundering money.

2001–present
As the 21st century dawned, the Russian mafia remained after the death of Aslan Usoyan. New mafia bosses sprang up, while imprisoned ones were released. Among the released were Marat Balagula and Vyacheslav Ivankov, both in 2004. The latter was extradited to Russia, but was jailed once more for his alleged murders of two Turks in a Moscow restaurant in 1992; he was cleared of all charges and released in 2005. Four years later, he was assassinated by a shot in the stomach from a sniper. Meanwhile, Monya Elson and Leonid Roytman were arrested in March 2006 for an unsuccessful murder plot against two Kyiv-based businessmen.

In 2009, FBI agents in Moscow targeted two suspected mafia leaders and two other corrupt businessmen. One of the leaders is Yevgeny Dvoskin, a criminal who had been in prison with Ivankov in 1995 and was deported in 2001 for breaking immigration regulations; the other is Konstantin "Gizya" Ginzburg, who was reportedly the current "big boss" of Russian organized crime in America before his reported assassination in 2009, it being suspected that Ivankov handed over control to him.

In the same year, Semion Mogilevich was placed on the FBI Ten Most Wanted Fugitives list for his involvement in a complex multimillion-dollar scheme that defrauded investors in the stock of his company YBM Magnex International, swindling them out of $150 million. He was indicted in 2003 and arrested in 2008 in Russia on tax fraud charges, but because the US does not have an extradition treaty with Russia, he was released on bail. Monya Elson said, in 1998, that Mogilevich is the most powerful mobster in the world.

Around the world, Russian mafia groups have popped up as dominating particular areas. Russian organized crime has a rather large stronghold in the city of Atlanta where members are distinguished by their tattoos. Russian organized crime was reported to have a stronger grip in the French Riviera region and Spain in 2010; and Russia was branded as a virtual "mafia state" according to the WikiLeaks cables.

In 2009, Russian mafia groups had been said to reach over 50 countries and, in 2010, had up to 300,000 members. According to recordings released in 2015, Alexander Litvinenko, shortly before he was assassinated, claimed that Semion Mogilevich has had a "good relationship" with Vladimir Putin since the 1990s.

On 7 June 2017, 33 Russian mafia affiliates and members were arrested and charged by the FBI, US Customs and Border Protection and NYPD for extortion, racketeering, illegal gambling, firearm offenses, narcotics trafficking, wire fraud, credit card fraud, identity theft, fraud on casino slot machines using electronic hacking devices; based in Atlantic City and Philadelphia, murder-for-hire conspiracy and cigarette trafficking. They were also accused of operating secret and underground gambling dens based in Brighton Beach, Brooklyn, and using violence to those who owed gambling debts, establishing nightclubs to sell drugs, plotting to force women associates to rob male strangers by seducing and drugging them with chloroform, and trafficking over 10,000 pounds of stolen chocolate confectionery; the chocolate was stolen from shipment containers. It is believed that 27 of the arrested are connected to the Russian mafia Shulaya clan which are largely based in New York. According to the prosecution, the Shulaya also has operations in New Jersey, Pennsylvania, Florida and Nevada. According to law enforcement and the prosecution, this is one of the first federal arrests against a Russian mafia boss and his underboss or co-leader.

On 26 September 2017, as part of a 4-year investigation, 100 Spanish Civil Guard officers carried out 18 searches in different areas of Malaga, Spain related to Russian mafia large scale money laundering. The raids resulted in the arrests of 11 members and associates of the Solntsevskaya and Izmailovskaya clans. Money, firearms and 23 high-end vehicles were also seized. The owner of Marbella FC, Alexander Grinberg, and manager of AFK Sistema, a Spanish football club in Malaga, were among those arrested.

On 19 February 2018, 18 defendants were accused of laundering over $62 million through real estate, including with the help of Vladislav Reznik, former chairman of Rosgosstrakh, one of Russia's largest insurance companies. The accused stood trial in Spain. The Tambov and Malyshev Russian mafia organisations were involved.

Aleksandr Torshin is allegedly a high ranking Russian mafia boss.

Structure and composition

Bratva structure
Note that these positions are not always official titles, but rather are understood names for roles that an individual performs.
 Pakhan – also called Boss, Krestniy Otets ("Capo di tutti capi | Godfather"), Vor (вор, "Thief"), Papa, or Avtoritet ("Authority").The Pakhan is at the top of the groups organizational structure. The Pakhan controls four criminal cells in the working unit through an intermediary called a "Brigadier."
 Two Spies – a security group who watches over the action of the Brigadiers to ensure loyalty and that none becomes too powerful. They are the Sovietnik ("Support Group") and Obshchak ("Security Group").
 Derzhatel Obshchaka - the bookkeeper, collects money from Brigadiers and bribes the government with Obshchak (money mafia intended for use in the interests of the group). This could be Brigadier, Pakhan, Authoritet.
 Brigadier – also called Avtoritet ("Authority"), is like a captain in charge of a small group of men (similar to a Caporegime in Italian-American Mafia crime families and Sicilian Mafia clans), He gives out jobs to Boyeviks ("Warriors") and pays tribute to Pakhan ("Boss"). He runs a crew which is called a "Brigade." A "Brigade" is made up of 5–6 Patsanov or Brodyag ("Soldiers").
 Bratok – also called Patsan or Brodyaga, works for a Brigadier having a special criminal activity to run (similar to soldiers in Italian-American Mafia crime families and Sicilian Mafia clans). A Boyevik is in charge of recruiting new soldiers and associates, in addition to paying tribute to his Brigadier. Boyevik's also make up the main strike force of a brigade.
 Shestyorka – an associate to the organization, also called the "six" (similar to associates in Italian-American Mafia crime families and Sicilian Mafia clans). He is an errand boy for the organization and is the lowest rank in the Russian mafia. The "Sixes" are assigned to "Avtorityet's" for support. They also provide intelligence for the upcoming "delo" ("Meeting") or on a certain target. They usually stay out of the main actions, although there might be exceptions depending on circumstances. During a "delo" Shestyorkas perform security functions standing on the look out (Shukher – literally: danger). It is a temporary position and an individual either makes it into the Vor-world or is cast aside. As they are earning their respect and trust in Bratva, they may be performing roles of the regular Boyeviks or Byki depending on the necessities and patronage of their Brigadier or Avtorityet. The etymology of the word 'shestyorka' comes from the lowest rank of a 36-playing-card deck – "sixes."

In the Russian mafia, "Vor" (plural: Vory) (literally, "Thief") is an honorary title analogous to a made man in the Italian-American and Sicilian mafia. The honor of becoming a Vor is given only when the recruit shows considerable leadership skills, personal ability, intellect, and charisma. A Pakhan or another high-ranking member of an organization can decide if the recruit will receive such title. When you become a member of the Vor-world you have to accept the code of the Vor v Zakone ("Thief in law").

Although Russian criminal groups vary in their structure, there have been attempts to devise a model of how they work. One such model (possibly outdated by now, as it is based on the old style of Soviet criminal enterprises) works out like this:

 Elite group – led by a Pakhan ("Boss") who is involved in management, organization, and ideology. This is the highest group that controls both the support group and the security group.
 Security group – led by one of Pakhan's spies. His job is to make sure the organization keeps running, keeps the peace between the organizations and other criminal groups, and paying off the right people. This group works with the Elite group and is equal in power with the Support groups. Is in charge of security and in intelligence.
 Support group – led by one of Pakhan's spies. His job is to watch over the working unit, and collect money while supervising their criminal activities. This group works with the Elite group and is equal in power with the Security group. They plan a specific crime for a specialized group or choose who carries out the operation.
 Working Unit – There are four Brigadiers running criminal activity in the working unit, each controlling a Brigade. This is the lowest group working with only the Support group. The group is involved in burglars, thieves, prostitution, extortion, street gangs, and other crimes.
Russian organized crime is also unique in that it does not possess a clearly defined, top-down hierarchy. Unlike the Italian mafias, with their capofamiglia, or the Chinese triads with their "mountain masters," the Russian mafia structural ranking does not include irreplaceable leaders. It would be impossible to take down a few "heads" of the Red Mafia in order to topple the entire organization because they simply do not exist. This gives ROC an invaluable strategic advantage over those attempting to dismantle it.

Notable individual groups
Groups based in and around the City of Moscow:

 Solntsevskaya Bratva: Led by Sergei "Mikhas" Mikhailov, it is Russia's largest criminal group with about 5,000 members, and is named after the Solntsevo District.

 Lyuberetskaya Bratva or Lyubery: One of the largest criminal groups with around 3,000 members in late 1990s until today. Based in (and originating from) Lyubertsy district of Moscow. Led by Denis Sergin (Fraser) since the 2000s. 

 The : One of Russia's oldest modern gangs, it was started in the mid- to late-1980s by Oleg Ivanov; it has around 200–500 members in Moscow alone, and is named after the Izmaylovo District. Izmailovskaya has good relations with the Podolskaya gang. Anton Malevsky was the leader until his death in 2001. The Ismailovskaya mafia is closely associated with Oleg Deripaska, Michael Cherney, and Iskander Makhmudov through their Switzerland based "Blonde Investment Company" and is closely associated with Vladimir Putin's SP AG. Liechtenstein police proved that Rudolf Ritter (brother to Michael Ritter, a Financial Minister) a Liechtenstein-based lawyer, jurist who practiced in offshore businesses (identification evasion), and financial manager for the accounts of both Putin's SPAG and the Ismailovskaya mafia and that Alexander Afanasyev ("Afonya") was connected to both SPAG and the Ismailovskaya mafia through his Panama registered Earl Holding AG. Also, Rudolf Ritter signed for Earl Holding, Berger International Holding, Repas Trading SA and Fox Consulting. The Colombia-based Cali KGB Cartel supplied cocaine to the Ismailovskaya mafia, too. Rudolf Ritter itself was arrested in May 2020 on money laundering charges.
 The Stukalov gang
 The Orekhovskaya gang: Founded by Sergei "Sylvester" Timofeyev, this group reached its height in Moscow in the 1990s. When Timofeyev died, Sergei Butorin took his place. However, he was sentenced to jail for life in 2011.
 The : one of the richest with its common fund kept in the United States. Located in the Podolsky, Chekhovsky, and Serpukhovsky districts of the Moscow region and beyond including close relations with mafia in the United States and Belgium. Their focus is oil and extortion. They provided support to Anatoly Bykov.

Groups based in other parts of Russia and the former Soviet Union:
 The Dolgoprudnenskaya gang: Russia's second largest criminal group. Originally from the City of Dolgoprudny.
Putin's long time personal body guard, Viktor Zolotov is very close to this group as well. the man most associated with them is Vladimir Kumarin.
 The Komarovskaya organized criminal group: (leader - Komar) controls the St. Petersburg-Vyborg highway (A181) called Scandinavia or the Russia part of the European highway E18, which includes everything along the road (hotels, repair garages, cafes and restaurants, etc.) and the transportation process as well as St. Petersburg's trucking businesses. Komarovskaya OPG steal automobiles, commit robberies, provide protection racketeering, and receive strong support from the Usvyatsov-Putyrsky gang and its AOZT "Putus" to organize the supply of cocaine from South America into Russia, Finland, Scandinavia and Europe and the trade in counterfeit dollars.
 The Usvyatsov-Putyrsky gang (AOZT "Putus") led by Vladimir Putyrsky (Vova-One-armed) and Leonid Ionovich Usvyatsov (Lenya-Sportsman) organizes both the supply of cocaine from South America into Russia, Finland, Scandinavia and Europe and the trade in counterfeit dollars and works closely with the Komarovskaya organized criminal group. Both Putyrsky and Usvyatsov have large estates in the Czech Republic where they enjoy hunting. During the 1980s, sambo coach "Trud" Usvyatsov, who was imprisoned for rape, robbery and theft, coached Vladimir Putin, Arkady Rotenberg, Boris Rotenberg and Nikolai Kononov.
 The Uzbek criminals in Litvinenko's Uzbek file, including Michael Cherney, Gafur Rakhimov, Vyacheslav Ivankov, and Salim Abduvaliev (also spelled Salim Abdulaev); are Uzbek origin KGB and later FSB officers at Moscow including Colonel Evgeny Khokholkov; were organized by Vladimir Putin while Putin was Deputy Mayor for Economic Affairs of St Petersburg in the early 1990s; and control Afghanistan origin drug trade through St Petersburg, Russia, and then to Europe. Boris Berezovsky told Litvinenko to brief his Uzbek file about corrupt FSB officers to the future Head of the FSB Putin which Litvinenko did on 25 July 1998 and, later, Litvinenko was imprisoned. Robert Eringer, head of Monaco's Security Service, confirmed Litvinenko's file about Vladimir Putin as a kingpin in Europe's narcotics trade. The Colombia-based Cali KGB Cartel supplied cocaine to this network, too. 
 The Slonovskaya gang was one of the strongest and violent criminal groups in CIS in the 1990s. It was based in Ryazan city. It had a long-term bloody wars with other active criminal groups in the city (Ayrapetovskaya, Kochetkovskie, etc.) with which it initially coexisted peacefully. The gang virtually disappeared by 2000 as its members were getting hunted down and imprisoned by local Russian Police. 
 The Uralmash gang of Yekaterinburg.
 The Chechen mafia is one of the largest ethnic organized crime groups operating in the former Soviet Union next to established Russian mafia groups.
 The Georgian mafia is regarded as one of the biggest, powerful and influential criminal networks in Europe, which has produced the biggest number of "thieves in law" in all former USSR countries.
 The Mkhedrioni was a paramilitary group involved in organised crime led by a Thief in law Jaba Ioseliani in Georgia in the 1990s.
 The city of Kazan was known for its gang culture, which later progressed into more organised, mafiaesque groups. This was known as the Kazan phenomenon.
Groups based in and around The United States of America:
 The Odessa Mafia: The most prominent and dominant Russian criminal group operating in the US; its headquarters is in Brighton Beach.
 Armenian Power, or AP-13, is a California-based crime syndicate tied to Russian and Armenian organised crime.
Groups based in other areas:
 The Brothers' Circle: Headed by Temuri Mirzoyev, this multi-ethnic transnational group is "composed of leaders and senior members of several Eurasian criminal groups largely based in countries of the former Soviet Union but operating in Europe, the Middle East, Africa, and Latin America." In 2011, US President Barack Obama and his administration named it one of four transnational organized crime groups that posed the greatest threat to US national security, and sanctioned certain key members and froze their assets. A year later, he extended the national emergency against them for another year.
 The Semion Mogilevich organization: Based in Budapest, Hungary and headed by the crime boss of the same name, this group numbered approximately 250 members as of 1996. Its business is often connected with that of the Solntsevskaya Bratva and the Vyacheslav Ivankov Organization. Aleksey Anatolyevich Lugovkov is the second-in-command, and Vitaly Borisovich Savalovsky is the "underboss" to Mogilevich.

See also

 Corruption in Russia
 Crime in Russia
 Criminal tattoos
 Gulag
 List of post-Soviet mobsters
 Mafia state
 Russian criminal tattoos
 Russian oligarch
 Thief in law
 Russian mafia in popular culture
 Russian mafia in Germany
 Russian mafia in Israel

References

Sources

Further reading
 Galeotti, Mark. 2018. The Vory. Yale University Press.
 
 Varese, Federico. 2005. The Russian Mafia. Oxford University Press.

External links
 Eurasian Transnational Organized Crime Groups

 
Mafia
Mafia
Crime in the Soviet Union
Mafia
Secret societies related to organized crime
Organized crime by ethnic or national origin
Transnational organized crime
Organised crime groups in Australia
Russian-Australian culture
Organised crime groups in Austria
Organized crime groups in the Czech Republic
Organized crime groups in Estonia
Organized crime groups in France
Organised crime groups in Germany
Organised crime groups in India
Organised crime groups in Israel
Organised crime groups in Italy
Organized crime groups in Russia
Organized crime groups in Slovakia
Organised crime groups in Spain
Organized crime groups in Switzerland
Organized crime groups in the United States
Gangs in Florida
Gangs in New York City
Second economy of the Soviet Union